Wilhelm Friedrich Ackermann (29 March 1896 – 24 December 1962) was a German mathematician and logician best known for his work in mathematical logic and the Ackermann function, an important example in the theory of computation.

Biography
Ackermann was born in Herscheid, Germany, and was awarded a Ph.D. by the University of Göttingen in 1925 for his thesis Begründung des "tertium non datur" mittels der Hilbertschen Theorie der Widerspruchsfreiheit, which was a consistency proof of arithmetic apparently without Peano induction (although it did use e.g. induction over the length of proofs). This was one of two major works in proof theory in the 1920s and the only one following Hilbert's school of thought. From 1929 until 1948, he taught at the Arnoldinum Gymnasium in Burgsteinfurt, and then at Lüdenscheid until 1961. He was also a corresponding member of the Akademie der Wissenschaften (Academy of Sciences) in Göttingen, and was an honorary professor at the University of Münster.

In 1928, Ackermann helped David Hilbert turn his 1917 – 22 lectures on introductory mathematical logic into a text, Principles of Mathematical Logic. This text contained the first exposition ever of first-order logic, and posed the problem of its completeness and decidability  (Entscheidungsproblem). Ackermann went on to construct consistency proofs for set theory (1937), full arithmetic (1940), type-free logic (1952), and a new axiomatization of set theory (1956).

Later in life, Ackermann continued working as a high school teacher. Still, he kept continually engaged in the field of research and published many contributions to the foundations of mathematics until the end of his life.  He died in Lüdenscheid, Germany in December 1962.

See also
Ackermann's bijection
Ackermann coding
Ackermann function
Ackermann ordinal
Ackermann set theory
Hilbert–Ackermann system
Entscheidungsproblem
Ordinal notation
Inverse Ackermann function

Bibliography
1928. "On Hilbert's construction of the real numbers" in Jean van Heijenoort, ed., 1967. From Frege to Gödel: A Source Book in Mathematical Logic, 1879–1931. Harvard Univ. Press: 493–507.
1940. "Zur Widerspruchsfreiheit der Zahlentheorie", Mathematische Annalen, vol. 117, pp 162–194.
1950 (1928).  (with David Hilbert) Principles of Mathematical Logic. Chelsea. Translation of 1938 German edition.
1954. Solvable cases of the decision problem. North Holland.

References

External links

Erich Friedman's page on Ackermann at Stetson University
Hermes, In memoriam WILHELM ACKERMANN 1896-1962 (PDF, 945 KB)
Author profile in the database zbMATH

1896 births
1962 deaths
Computability theorists
People from Lüdenscheid
People from the Province of Westphalia
University of Göttingen alumni
Academic staff of the University of Münster
German Lutherans
20th-century German mathematicians
German logicians
20th-century German philosophers
German male writers
20th-century Lutherans
Members of the Göttingen Academy of Sciences and Humanities